Verkh-Anos (Üstügi Onos) is a rural locality (a settlement) in Anosinskoye Rural Settlement of Chemalsky District, the Altai Republic, Russia. The population was 27 as of 2016. There is 1 street.

Geography 
Verkh-Anos is located in the valley of the Katun River, 24 km northwest of Chemal (the district's administrative centre) by road. Anos is the nearest rural locality.

References 

Rural localities in Chemalsky District